The Debré family is a French family including several prominent politicians and physicians. The family's ancestor, rabbi Simon Debré, was born in Westhoffen, Alsace. His ancestors came from Harburg, Bavaria

 Simon Debré (1854–1939), rabbi
 x 1882 Marianne Trenel (1860–1949)
 │
 ├──> Robert Debré (1882–1978), physician 
 │    x 1908 Jeanne Debat-Ponsan (1879–1929), daughter of Édouard Debat-Ponsan (1847 - 1913)
 │    │
 │    ├──> Michel Debré (1912–1996), politician  
 │    │     x 1936 Anne-Marie Lemaresquier (1912-)
 │    │     │
 │    │     ├──> Vincent Debré (1939-), businessman
 │    │     │     x Isabelle de Lacroix-Vaubois (1957-)
 │    │     │
 │    │     ├──> François Debré (1942-2020), journalis
 │    │     │    │
 │    │     │    └──> Constance Debré, novelist 
 │    │     ├──> Bernard Debré (1944-2020), physician and politician
 │    │     │  
 │    │     │
 │    │     └──> Jean-Louis Debré (born 1944), politician
 │    │          │
 │    │          └──> Guillaume Debré, journalist 
 │    ├──> Claude Debré (1913- ), physician
 │    │    x 1942 Philippe Monod-Broca (1918–2006), surgeon
 │    │ 
 │    └──> Olivier Debré (1920–1999), painter
 │       
 │
 └──> Claire Debré (1888–1972)
      x 1907 Anselme Schwartz (1872–1957), surgeon and member of the Académie des sciences
      │
      └──> Laurent Schwartz (1915–2002), mathematician

References 

Political families of France
Jewish families
Alsatian Jews